"God" (stylized as "GOD.") is a song by American rapper Kendrick Lamar, from his fourth studio album Damn, released on April 14, 2017. The thirteenth and penultimate track on the album (second on the Collector's Edition of Damn), the song was produced by Riera, Sounwave, DJ Dahi, Bëkon, Cardo, Tiffith, with additional production by Yung Exclusive, Mike Hector and Teddy Walton.

The song details Lamar's successes, how it feels, and why he works so hard to get to where he is today. The song also finds Lamar declaring his faux-divinity as a rap god.

Background 
Before the release of Damn, the album itself was rumored to be centered around God. It was soon confirmed by Lamar himself. Lamar has been a devout Christian since approximately his late teen years or adolescence.

Lyrics 
According to Jake Woolf of GQ magazine, Lamar trolls Canadian musician and rapper Drake by imitating his singing voice on the song's chorus.

Live performances 
Lamar performed "God" live at the Coachella Valley Music and Arts Festival on April 23, 2017.

Lamar has performed "God" at every show as an encore on the Damn tour.

Credits and personnel 
Credits adapted from the official Damn digital booklet.
Kendrick Lamar – songwriter
Ricci Riera – songwriter, producer
Mark Spears – songwriter, producer
Dacoury Natche – songwriter, producer
Daniel Tannenbaum – songwriter
Bēkon – producer, additional vocals
Ronald LaTour – songwriter, producer
Anthony Tiffith – songwriter, producer
Mike Hector – additional drums
Derek Ali – mixing
Tyler Page – mix assistant
Cyrus Taghipour – mix assistant

Charts

Certifications

References 

2017 songs
Kendrick Lamar songs
Songs written by Kendrick Lamar
Songs written by DJ Dahi
Songs written by Sounwave
Songs written by Cardo (record producer)
Songs written by Teddy Walton
Songs written by Daniel Tannenbaum